Protect the Maneaba is a political party in Kiribati created by the merger of the National Progressive Party and the Christian Democratic Party.
At the last presidential elections of July 4, 2003, its candidate Harry Tong won 43.5% of the vote, leaving his brother Anote Tong, with 47.4%, the winner. In the legislative elections of two months earlier, the party won 24 out of 41 elected seats. In the 22 August and 30 August 2007 House of Assembly of Kiribati elections, the party won only 7 seats. Maneaba is Gilbertese for Assembly (and thus forms part in "House of the Assembly": Maneaba ni Maungatabu).

Political parties in Kiribati